Thorybothrips is a genus of thrips in the family Phlaeothripidae.

Species
 Thorybothrips unicolor
 Thorybothrips yuccae

References

Phlaeothripidae
Thrips
Thrips genera